Normunds is a Latvian masculine given name and may refer to:
Normunds Lasis (born 1985), Latvian cyclist
Normunds Miezis (born 1971), Latvian chess Grandmaster
Normunds Pūpols (born 1984), Latvian high jumper
Normunds Sējējs (born 1968), Latvian ice hockey player and coach
Normunds Sietiņš (born 1967), Latvian high jumper

References

Latvian masculine given names